Neville Wakefield (born 1963) is an art curator.

Life and work
Wakefield was born in England, United Kingdom. He is the curator and artistic director of Desert X.

Personal life
He lives and works between the Isles of Scilly and Harlem, New York.

See also
 POSTmatter (magazine)
 Helmut Lang (artist)
 Destricted
 The Cremaster Cycle

References

Living people
1963 births
British art critics
British art curators
Cultural historians